Samuel John Gurney Hoare, 1st Viscount Templewood,  (24 February 1880 – 7 May 1959), more commonly known as Sir Samuel Hoare, was a senior British Conservative politician who served in various Cabinet posts in the Conservative and National governments of the 1920s and 1930s.

Hoare was Secretary of State for Air during most of the 1920s. As Secretary of State for India in the early 1930s, he authored the Government of India Act 1935, which granted self-government at a provincial level to India. He was most famous for serving as Foreign Secretary in 1935, when he authored the Hoare–Laval Pact with French Prime Minister Pierre Laval. This partially recognised the Italian conquest of Abyssinia (modern Ethiopia) and Hoare was forced to resign by the ensuing public outcry. In 1936 he returned to the Cabinet as First Lord of the Admiralty, then served as Home Secretary from 1937 to 1939 and was again briefly Secretary of State for Air in 1940. He was seen as a leading "appeaser" and his removal from office (along with that of Sir John Simon and the removal of Neville Chamberlain as Prime Minister) was a condition of Labour's agreement to serve in a coalition government in May 1940.

Hoare also served as British ambassador to Spain from 1940 to 1944.

Youth
Hoare was born in London on 24 February 1880, the eldest son of Sir Samuel Hoare, 1st Baronet, who was a Conservative MP from a by-election in 1886 until 1906, and to whose baronetcy he succeeded in 1915. His family were the Anglo-Irish branch of an old Quaker family, with a long history of involvement in banking. He was a descendant of Samuel Hoare, but the family had abandoned Quakerism in the mid eighteenth century and Hoare was brought up an Anglo-Catholic.

Hoare was educated at Harrow School, where he was a classical scholar, and New College, Oxford. As an undergraduate he was awarded a blue in racquets and was a member of the Gridiron and Bullingdon Clubs. Initially he studied classics, taking a first in Mods in 1901, before switching to Modern History, graduating with a first class B.A. in 1903. He was awarded his M.A. in 1910. He later became Honorary Fellow of New College.

Hoare was "indubitably homosexual", but being highly ambitious and discreet (his nickname amongst colleagues was 'Slippery Sam'), may not have acted much upon it. On 17 October 1909, he married Lady Maud Lygon (1882–1962), youngest daughter of The 6th Earl Beauchamp. Their marriage was childless. It was, in the words of R. J. Q. Adams, "not at first a love match" but in time became "a devoted partnership". His biographer has stated, "it would probably be more appropriate to describe it as a mariage de convenance". Hoare inherited Sidestrand Hall in 1915. His London home was 18 Cadogan Gardens. 

Hoare was short, slightly built and a dapper dresser. As a youth he took up games to bolster his physique, including figure skating. He became a tournament-level shot and tennis player. He was a poor speaker but a good writer. He was hard-working but cold.

Early political career
In 1905, Hoare's father arranged for him to be secretary to the Colonial Secretary Alfred Lyttelton to gain political experience. Hoare stood unsuccessfully in the 1906 General Election for Parliament at Ipswich, but became a justice of the peace for the county of Norfolk that year.

Hoare entered local politics in March 1907, when he was elected to the London County Council as a member of the Municipal Reform Party, the local government wing of the Conservative Party, representing Brixton. He served as Chairman of the London Fire Brigade Committee. He served on the LCC until 1910.

Hoare was elected to the House of Commons at the January 1910 general election as Member of Parliament (MP) for Chelsea. In the early years, he was a member of the Anti-Socialist Union. 

During the Conservative Party leadership contest of November 1911, Hoare wrote pledging support to both leading candidates, Austen Chamberlain and Walter Long. There is no evidence that he made such an offer to Bonar Law, who became leader after the two front-runners withdrew to avoid a potential party split. Hoare showed little interest in the two largest issues of the day: House of Lords reform and Irish Home Rule. He joined the Unionist Social Reform Committee. He supported tariff reform, female suffrage and public education. He opposed Welsh disestablishment quite strongly. He encouraged colleagues to call him "Sam" at the time to soften his hard and detached image.

First World War
Aged 34 at the time, Hoare joined the Army soon after the outbreak of the First World War. He was commissioned into the Norfolk Yeomanry as a temporary lieutenant on 17 October 1914. To his disappointment, he was initially only a recruiting officer and illness prevented him from serving at the front. He was promoted to temporary captain on 24 April 1915.

While acting as a recruiting officer, he learnt Russian. In 1916, he was recruited by Mansfield Cumming to be the future MI6's liaison officer with the Russian Intelligence service in Petrograd (now Saint Petersburg). He soon became head of the British Intelligence Mission to the Russian General Staff with the temporary rank of lieutenant-colonel. In that post, he reported to the British government the death of Rasputin and apologised, because of the sensational nature of the event, for having written it in the style of the Daily Mail.

In March 1917 he was posted to Rome, where he remained until the end of the war. His duties included helping to dissuade Italy from dropping out of the war. In Italy, he met and recruited the former socialist leader Benito Mussolini on behalf of the British overseas intelligence service, which was then known as MI1(c). Britain's intelligence service helped Mussolini to finance his first forays into Italian politics as a pro-war spokesman. Hoping to keep Italy on its side in 1917, during the First World War, British intelligence gave Mussolini, a 34-year-old newspaper editor, £100 a week to keep his propaganda flowing.

For his services in the war, Hoare was twice mentioned in despatches, appointed Commander of the Order of St Michael and St George (CMG) in 1917, and awarded the Orders of St Anne and St Stanislas of Russia, and of St Maurice and St Lazarus of Italy.

Interwar period

Secretary of State for Air
Hoare was re-elected to Parliament in 1918, but by 1922, he had become disillusioned with David Lloyd George after the honours scandal and the Chanak Crisis. He helped organise the backbench revolt at the Carlton Club meeting (19 October 1922), which brought down Lloyd George's coalition. In Bonar Law's new Conservative government he was made a Privy Councillor and Secretary of State for Air, but he was not made a member of the Cabinet until Stanley Baldwin succeeded Law as Prime Minister in May 1923.

In 1923, Hoare presided over the merger (with £1 million state subsidy) of the four principal private air carriers to form Imperial Airways, an ancestor of today's British Airways. The Conservatives fell from power in January 1924, but Hoare was once again Secretary of State for Air in Baldwin's Second Government (1924-1929). As Secretary of State for Air he sided with Trenchard on the importance of the Royal Air Force remaining an independent service. He established air squadrons at Oxford University and Cambridge University to train students as potential RAF officers and re-established a permanent air cadet college at Cranwell.

Lady Maud was awarded the DBE in February 1927, and Hoare was awarded the Knight Grand Cross of the British Empire (GBE) in June 1927. Hoare and Lady Maud travelled by air whenever possible, including the first civilian flight to India in 1927. In 1927 he published a book, India by Air. By 1929 there were regular scheduled routes to India and Cape Town.

Hoare continued his interest in aviation affairs as Honorary Air Commodore of No 601 (County of London) (1930–32) and No 604 (County of Middlesex) (1932–57) Bomber Squadrons of the Auxiliary Air Force.

In opposition
Hoare was treasurer of the Conservative Party in opposition in 1929–1931.

In 1930, he published The Fourth Seal on World War I Russia.

Hoare was a delegate to the First Round Table Conference on India's constitutional future in 1930–1931. He also helped to mediate between Baldwin and the press barons Lords Rothermere and Beaverbrook, who were intriguing for his removal as Conservative leader.

Secretary of State for India
Hoare was one of the Conservative negotiators in talks with Ramsay MacDonald in August 1931 over the formation of the National Government. On 26 August 1931 Hoare was appointed Secretary of State for India.

At the Second Round Table Conference, Hoare enjoyed good relations with Mahatma Gandhi. He committed Britain to eventual self-government for India, but that was not enough for Gandhi, who wanted full independence. Lord Lothian's report on the extension of the Indian franchise was considered. A White Paper containing the government's legislative proposals for India's constitution was drawn up in March 1933. A Select Committee of Both Houses began to meet for over a year and half in April 1933 to consider the government's plans. In January 1934, Hoare was appointed Knight Grand Cross of the Star of India (GCSI) in the New Year Honours.

Ill feeling between Hoare and Churchill, who opposed Indian self-government, reached its peak in April 1934. The British government proposed for the Indian government to retain the power to impose tariffs on British textiles. The Manchester Chamber of Commerce, representing the Lancashire cotton trade, initially opposed that since it wanted Lancashire goods to be exported freely to India. Churchill accused Hoare of having, with the aid of the Earl of Derby, breached parliamentary privilege by improperly influencing the Manchester Chamber of Commerce to drop its opposition.

Hoare was completely exonerated by the Committee on Privileges. Churchill gave a powerful speech in the Commons Chamber that attacked the committee's findings. On 13 June 1934, Leo Amery spoke, arguing that Churchill's true aim was to bring down the government under the cover of the doctrine fiat justicia ruat caelum ("may justice be done, though the heavens fall"). Churchill, who was neither a lawyer nor a classicist, growled "translate it!" Amery replied that it meant "If I can trip up Sam, the Government's bust". The ensuing laughter made Churchill look ridiculous.

The Select Committee of Both Houses finished its deliberations in November 1934. The result was one of the most complicated pieces of legislation in British parliamentary history, a bill that spent the first half of 1935 passing through Parliament before becoming the Government of India Act 1935. The Bill contained 473 clauses and 16 schedules, and the debates took up 4,000 pages of Hansard. Hoare had to answer 15,000 questions and make 600 speeches and completely dominated the committee stage of the bill, just as he had during the Round Table Conferences, by his mastery of detail and his skill at dealing tactfully with deputations. Alec Douglas-Home, later to be Prime Minister, commented in his autobiography, "The most noteworthy performance of that Parliament was without question the piloting of the India Independence Bill through the House of Commons by the Secretary of State, Sir Samuel Hoare, ably assisted by Mr. R. A. Butler (later Lord Butler)". Butler, who, as Under-Secretary, had helped to steer the bill through the Commons, wrote of Hoare that he saw life as "a chapter in a great Napoleonic biography" and added "I was amazed by his ambition; I admired his imagination; I shared his ideals; I stood in awe of his intellectual capacity. But I was never touched by his humanity. He was the coldest fish with whom I ever had to deal".

Hoare was widely praised for his conduct as India Secretary but was close to exhaustion after the difficult passage of the Bill, which was opposed by Churchill and by many rank-and-file Conservatives. The Act became law in August 1935, when Hoare had moved on to his next position.

Although provincial governments were elected in 1937, the Act was never fully implemented because of the outbreak of the Second World War in 1939.

Foreign Secretary
In June 1935, Baldwin became prime minister for the third time. He offered Hoare a choice of the job of Viceroy of India or Foreign Secretary. Hoare, who was ambitious to become Prime Minister, chose the latter to enable him to remain active in domestic politics. The position would later make him notorious.

Hoare took office against a backdrop of what R.J.Q. Adams described as "much idle talk" of "mutual security". In March 1935, MacDonald's White Paper had committed Britain to limited rearmament.

Italy, which also controlled Libya, straddled Britain's sea route across the Mediterranean to Egypt, the Suez Canal and India. The bombast of the Italian dictator Benito Mussolini was not taken very seriously in Britain. In April 1935, the then Prime Minister Ramsay MacDonald and Foreign Secretary Sir John Simon had signed the Stresa Front on 14 April 1935, an alliance with France and Italy, the last of which had joined the Allies in World War One and was suspicious of German designs on Austria. However, the Stresa Front did not last. It came to nothing after Britain, without consulting the other members, signed the Anglo-German Naval Agreement. That dismayed France, which soon signed an Franco-Soviet Treaty of Mutual Assistance.

By mid-1935, Mussolini was clearly preparing to attack Abyssinia. On 12 September 1935 Hoare gave what Adams calls "the greatest speech of his career" to the League General Assembly at Geneva. He declared that Britain stood "for steady and collective resistance to all acts of unprovoked aggression". His speech was widely praised in the world press but did not deter the full-scale Italian invasion of Abyssinia on 3 October. Limited sanctions were imposed on Italy but excluded oil. A general election on 14 November 1935 had over 90% of the candidates support the League of Nations, and there was much support for sanctions against Italy although they were not necessarily in Britain's interests.

With the election out of the way, the government, with the agreement of the League Council, authorised Hoare to find a solution. Hoare sent Sir Maurice Peterson, the head of the Foreign Office Abyssinia Department, to Paris to negotiate a compromise offer to Mussolini. An agreement was reached by the end of November: Italy was to gain territory in the north, with the rump of Abyssinia to be an Italian client state and its army under Italian control. Abyssinia had not been consulted. By December 1935, Hoare was still in poor health and suffering from fainting spells since the stressful period of passing the Government of India Act. Suffering from a serious infection, he stopped off in Paris on his way to a skating holiday in Switzerland. The ensuing Hoare–Laval Pact with French Prime Minister Pierre Laval was unanimously approved by the Cabinet on 9–10 December.

It was leaked to the French and then to the British press, causing a public outcry, not least because of memories of Hoare's recent Geneva speech. Hoare, who had been injured in a skating accident, returned to Britain on 16 December.

The Cabinet met on the morning of 18 December. Lord Halifax, who was due to make a statement in the Lords that afternoon, insisted for Hoare to resign to save the government's position, causing J. H. Thomas, William Ormsby-Gore and Walter Elliott to come out for Hoare's resignation as well. Privately, however, Halifax was puzzled by the moral outrage as the Hoare-Laval Pact was little different from proposals that had been put forward by the League Committee of Five.

Hoare resigned on 18 December. His successor was Anthony Eden. When Eden had his first audience with King George V, the King is said to have remarked humorously, "No more coals to Newcastle, no more Hoares to Paris."

In his memoirs, Hoare admitted that his negotiations in Paris with Laval had caught him at a disadvantage. He noted that in the absence of the Hoare–Laval Pact, the Italians seized all of Abyssinia and drew closer to Germany, which eventually led to the destabilisation of Austria and the indefensibility of Czechoslovakia.

First Lord of the Admiralty
It was widely recognised that Hoare had been a scapegoat for Cabinet policy. His return to Baldwin's Cabinet as First Lord of the Admiralty in June 1936 was widely praised in the press. It was too quickly for Halifax. Eden later wrote in his memoirs that Halifax "criticised Baldwin sharply for yielding to Hoare’s importunity". Hoare vigorously endorsed Britain's naval rearmament, including ordering the first three King George V-class battleships, and worked to reverse the subordination of the British naval aviation to the Royal Air Force.

Home Secretary
On Baldwin's retirement, the new Prime Minister, Neville Chamberlain, offered Hoare any office that he liked except the Exchequer, which Hoare would have liked but had been promised to Simon. Hoare chose the Home Office (28 May 1937). Hoare was still seen as a possible successor to Chamberlain.

Hoare had a long family interest in judicial and penal reform. The Quaker prison reformer Elizabeth Fry was his great-great aunt. RJQ Adams wrote highly of his time as Home Secretary. Roy Jenkins wrote that Hoare was the most liberal Home Secretary between H. H. Asquith (1892–1895) and Rab Butler (1957–1962).

In 1938, Hoare was instrumental in obtaining approval for the British rescue effort on behalf of endangered Jewish children in Europe, which was known as the Kindertransport.

In September 1938, Hoare was part of the informal inner Cabinet, along with Simon and Halifax, and was one of the few consulted by Chamberlain about "Plan Z" to fly to meet Hitler for a summit meeting, a decision that was then popular.

Hoare's later account of the Munich Agreement was anguished. Hoare had close links to the Czechoslovak government. In retirement, he stood strongly by Chamberlain's essential judgements but regretted Chamberlain's lack of sensitivity in foreign affairs and his tendency for personal intervention that led to his failure to retain Eden and to override his Foreign Office advisers. However, Hoare repeatedly pointed out that public opinion was vociferously pacifist and that Chamberlain's actions were widely endorsed at the time, not least by US President Franklin Roosevelt. Also, the Labour opposition strongly opposed rearmament and the introduction of conscription, even after Munich.

In spring 1939, Hoare aligned himself very firmly with Chamberlain's upbeat belief that war was now unlikely, rather than with Halifax's increasing focus on shoring up alliances and rearming for a conflict that to seemed imminent to Halifax.

Samuel Hoare speaking of a possible future disarmament conference between Adolf Hitler, Benito Mussolini, Edouard Daladier, Joseph Stalin and Neville Chamberlain, March 1939

In 1939, Hoare almost carried the most comprehensive Criminal Justice Reform Bill in British history: he had intended to abolish corporal punishment in prisons and had been keen to work towards the abolition of the death penalty of whose risks he was very aware. The Bill was cancelled because of the outbreak of war. Most of its provisions were successfully reintroduced by James Chuter Ede as Home Secretary in 1948, with support from Hoare, who by then was in the House of Lords.

Hoare pumped energy into the Air Raid Precautions Department and the Women's Voluntary Service Organisation.

Second World War
On the outbreak of war, Hoare became Lord Privy Seal in the nine-man War Cabinet (3 September 1939), with a wide-ranging brief. On 5 April 1940, Hoare briefly returned to the Air Ministry, swapping places with Sir Kingsley Wood, and later that month came under fire during the Norway Debate which brought down the Chamberlain government. Then, the resignations of himself, Chamberlain and Sir John Simon were essential preconditions for Labour to join a coalition government. Hoare was one of the foremost Chamberlain loyalists and was shocked at the apparent disloyalty of others, such as Halifax.

Alexander Cadogan saw Hoare as a potential quisling in 1940, but Leo Amery and Lord Beaverbrook thought highly of him. Another Foreign Office mandarin, Robert Vansittart, thought him prim and precise but not a resilient figure in political struggle.

Following Winston Churchill's appointment as Prime Minister on 10 May 1940, Hoare was dropped from the government altogether unlike Chamberlain, Halifax and even Simon. He still hoped in vain to be Viceroy of India.

After a brief period of unemployment Hoare was sent as Ambassador to Spain, with his wife, Lady Maud Hoare. In that demanding and critical role he helped to arrange the return of thousands of Allied prisoners from Spanish gaols and successfully helped to dissuade Francisco Franco from formally joining the Axis.

Hoare loathed Franco and found him a puzzling and obtuse interlocutor. (Hoare found Franco's Portuguese counterpart, António de Oliveira Salazar, much more pleasant to deal with.) His fluent memoir of the period, Ambassador on Special Mission, is an excellent insight into the day-to-day life of a demanding diplomatic job, his primary challenges being to dissuade Franco from his preferred drift to the Axis powers and to prevent the Allies from reacting with undue haste to repeated Spanish provocations. Hoare's memoir is not completely frank about his deployment of an array of bluff, leaks, bribery and subterfuge to disrupt unfriendly elements in Franco's regime and the operations of the German embassy, but those methods were remembered fondly by his team.

In June 1941, Spain, ostensibly remaining non-belligerent, was preparing to send a division of volunteers to fight on the side of Germany against the Soviet Union, the so-called "División Azul" Blue Division. On 24 June, a big demonstration of students was organised by the regime in support of the expedition. The demonstration ended in front of the Falange Party's headquarters, where Ramón Serrano Suñer was present and gave a speech. There was much anti-British sentiment in Spain, and some students went to the nearby British embassy and started throwing stones and to attack the embassy building. Hoare called Serrano Suñer on the telephone, and they had a heated exchange. Serrano Suñer asked him if he wanted him to send more police to protect the embassy to which Hoare famously responded, "Don't send more police, just send fewer students".

Hoare also helped to prevent Spanish interference with Operation Torch in November 1942.

On 14 July 1944, he was created Viscount Templewood (the name was that of a country house at Sidestrand) of Chelsea in the County of Middlesex. With the issue of Spanish neutrality no longer in doubt, his ambassadorship ended in December 1944, and he returned to Britain.

Later life
In the House of Lords, Viscount Templewood served on the Political Honours Scrutiny Committee from 1950 and chaired it from 1954. He gave energetic support to penal reform, the Criminal Justice Act 1948 and the abolition of capital punishment. He took up many company directorships.

He was President of the Lawn Tennis Association (1932–56), an elder brother of Trinity House (1936–1950), Chancellor of the University of Reading (1937 until his death in 1959), Chairman of the Council of the Howard League for Penal Reform (1947–59), President of the Magistrates' Association (1947–52), President of the Air League of the British Empire (1953-1956), and President of the National Skating Association (1945–57).

Templewood published a number of books after the war, including Ambassador on Special Mission (1946) about his time in Spain, The Unbroken Thread (1949), a family memoir, The Shadow of the Gallows (1951) on capital punishment, and Nine Troubled Years (1954), a memoir of the 1930s.

In addition to those awarded for his services in the First World War, he held the following foreign honours:

Grand Cross of the Order of the White Lion of Czechoslovakia.
Grand Cross of the Order of the Polar Star of Sweden.
Grand Cross of the Order of the Dannebrog of Denmark.
Grand Cross of the Order of Orange-Nassau of the Netherlands.

He died aged 79 of a heart attack, at his home, 12a Eaton Mansions, Chelsea, London, on 7 May 1959. He was buried at Sidestrand parish churchyard in Norfolk.  As his marriage was childless, and his brother had pre-deceased him, the baronetcy and peerage became extinct upon his death.

Templewood's estate was valued for probate at £186,944 3s 6d (just over £4.5m at 2016 prices). His residence, Templewood House, in Frogshall, Northrepps, Norfolk, was inherited by his nephew, the architect Paul Edward Paget.

Hoare's widow Viscountess Templewood died in 1962.

Arms

In literature

Hoare, in his later role as Ambassador to Spain, appears in C.J.Sansom's WWII spy thriller "Winter in Madrid".

References

Bibliography

 Braddick, H. B. (1962) "The Hoare-Laval Plan: A Study in International Politics" Review of Politics 24#3 (1962), pp. 342–364. in JSTOR

 Coutts, Matthew Dean. (2011). "The Political Career of Sir Samuel Hoare during the National Government 1931–40" (PhD dissertation University of Leicester, 2011). online bibliography on pp 271–92.

 Holt, Andrew. "'No more Hoares to Paris': British foreign policymaking and the Abyssinian Crisis, 1935." Review of International Studies 37.3 (2011): 1383–1401.
 Jago, Michael Rab Butler: The Best Prime Minister We Never Had?, Biteback Publishing 2015 
 (essay on Simon, pp365–92)

 (pp. 364–8), essay on Hoare written by R. J. Q. Adams.
 Roberts, Andrew, The Holy Fox The Life of Lord Halifax. London, 1991.
 Robertson, J. C. (1975) "The Hoare-Laval Plan", Journal of Contemporary History 10#3 (1975), pp. 433–464. in JSTOR

Primary sources

External links 

 
 

 

1880 births
1959 deaths
Alumni of New College, Oxford
British Secretaries of State for Foreign Affairs
Secretaries of State for the Home Department
British Secretaries of State
Norfolk Yeomanry officers
Royal Army Service Corps officers
Honorary air commodores
First Lords of the Admiralty
Lords Privy Seal
Hoare, Samuel
Hoare, Samuel
Hoare, Samuel
Hoare, Samuel
Hoare, Samuel
Hoare, Samuel
Hoare, Samuel
Hoare, Samuel
Hoare, Samuel
Hoare, Samuel
Hoare, Samuel
Members of the Privy Council of the United Kingdom
English Anglicans
Companions of the Order of St Michael and St George
Knights Grand Commander of the Order of the Star of India
Knights Grand Cross of the Order of the British Empire
Knights Grand Cross of the Order of Orange-Nassau
Grand Crosses of the Order of the White Lion
Commanders Grand Cross of the Order of the Polar Star
Grand Crosses of the Order of the Dannebrog
Recipients of the Order of St. Anna
Recipients of the Order of Saints Maurice and Lazarus
Diplomatic peers
Chancellors of the University of Reading
Ambassadors of the United Kingdom to Spain
Hoare, Samuel
Municipal Reform Party politicians
Secretaries of State for Air (UK)
Ministers in the Chamberlain wartime government, 1939–1940
Viscounts created by George VI
Ministers in the Chamberlain peacetime government, 1937–1939
People educated at Harrow School